Heinzendorf may refer to:

Places
 Hynčice, municipality in the Okres Náchod, Czech Republic
 Jasienica (Heinzendorf, Kreis Teschen), municipality in the Powiat Bielski, Poland
 Vítějeves (Heinzendorf bei Politschka), municipality in the Okres Svitavy, Czech Republic
 Bagno (Heinzendorf, Kreis Wohlau), urban locality in the municipality Oborniki Śląskie, Powiat Trzebnicki, Poland
 Henčov (Heinzendorf bei Iglau), locality of Jihlava, Okres Jihlava, Czech Republic
 Hynčice pod Sušinou (Heinzendorf unter der Dürren Koppe), locality of Staré Město pod Sněžníkem, Okres Šumperk, Czech Republic
 Hynčice nad Moravou (Heinzendorf an der March), locality of Hanušovice, Okres Šumperk, Czech Republic
 Hynčice u Krnova (Heinzendorf bei Olbersdorf), locality of Město Albrechtice, Okres Bruntál, Czech Republic
 Hynčice u Vražného (Heinzendorf bei Odrau), locality of Vražné, Okres Nový Jičín, Czech Republic 
 Jasienica (Heinzendorf, Kreis Münsterberg), urban locality in the municipality Ziębice, Powiat Ząbkowicki, Poland
 Skrzynka (Heinzendorf, Kreis Habelschwerdt), urban locality in the municipality Lądek-Zdrój, Powiat Kłodzki
 Unikowice (Heinzendorf, Kreis Neiße), urban locality in the municipality Paczków, Powiat nyski, Poland
 Witoszyce (Heinzendorf, Kreis Guhrau), urban locality in the municipality Góra, Powiat Górowski, Poland
 Wrociszów (Heinzendorf, Kreis Freystadt), urban locality in the municipality Nowa Sól, Powiat Nowosolski, Poland
 Jędrzychów (Groß-Heinzendorf), urban locality in the municipality Polkowice, Powiat Polkowicki, Poland
 Jędrzychówek (Klein-Heinzendorf), urban locality in the municipality Przemków, Powiat Polkowicki, Poland
 Horní Hynčina (Ober Heinzendorf), locality of Pohledy, Okres Svitavy, Czech Republic
 Hynčina (Unter Heinzendorf), municipality in the Okres Šumperk, Czech Republic